Team HP-Sferis is a professional MTB cycling team based in Poland that participates in UCI races. The team is managed by Piotr Kosmala, who is assisted by directeur sportifs Robert Duda and Zbigniew Piątek.

Major wins 

1999
Stage 1, 4 & 6 Vuelta a Argentina
Overall Settimana Lombarda
Stage 4b
Overall Szlakiem Grodów Piastowskich
Stage 2a
Stage 4 Circuit des Mines
Stage 3, 7 & 8 Course de la Paix
Overall Tour of Japan
Stage 2
Stage 4 Tour of Britain
Overall Course de la Solidarité Olympique
Stage 2 & 3
 Lithuanian Time Trial Championship
 Polish Road Race Championship
Overall Bałtyk–Karkonosze Tour
Stage 1a, 3, 5 & 6
Stage 8 & 11 Volta a Portugal
Memoriał Henryka Łasaka
Memoriał Andrzeja Kaczyny i Andrzeja Malinowskiego
Puchar Tatr
Overall Tour de Pologne
Stage 5, 6 & 7
Stage 5a, 7a & 9a, Commonwealth Bank Classic
2000
Overall Tour d'Egypte
Stage 1, 2, 4, 5, 6 & 7
Overall Ringerike GP
Stage 1
Overall Szlakiem Grodów Piastowskich
Stage 1, 2a, 2b & 3
GP Weltour
Lubelski Wyścig 3-Majowy
Overall Course de la Paix
Stage 2
Stage 1, 2, 5 & 6 Tour of Japan
Overall Course de la Solidarité Olympique
Stage 2a, 2b & 3
First Union Wilmington Classic
GP Ostrowca Swiętokrzyskiego
 Polish Road Race Championship
 Polish Time Trial Championship
 Lithuanian Time Trial Championship
Stage 2, 4, 5b & 6 Bałtyk–Karkonosze Tour
Memoriał Andrzeja Kaczyny i Andrzeja Malinowskiego
Puchar Tatr
Memoriał Henryka Łasaka
Stage 1 Tour de Pologne
Overall Herald Sun Tour
Stage 7
Overall Commonwealth Bank Classic
Stage 3a, 3b, 4a, 5a, 9a
2001
Overall Giro del Capo
Stage 2
Stage 1 Ringerike GP
Overall Szlakiem Grodów Piastowskich
Stage 2a
Memoriał Andrzeja Trochanowskiego
Stage 2, 6 & 8b, Course de la Paix
Memoriał Pawła Sosika
Overall Tour of Japan
Stage 1 & 4
Stage 1 GP de Beauce
GP Ostrowca Swiętokrzyskiego
 Lithuanian Time Trial Championship
Stage 3 Dookoła Mazowska
Memoriał Henryka Łasaka
Memoriał Andrzeja Kaczyny i Andrzeja Malinowskiego
GP Z.M. "Mroz"
Stage 3 & 5 Tour de Pologne
Stage 3 & 4 Course 4 Asy Fiata Autopoland
Stage 7b & 10 Herald Sun Tour
2002
Stage 3 Giro del Capo
Stage 2a & 3 Szlakiem Grodów Piastowskich
Lubelski Wyścig 3-Majowy
Memoriał Andrzeja Trochanowskiego
Stage 6a & 7 Course de la Paix
Overall Tour of Japan
Stage 3
Overall Bałtyk–Karkonosze Tour
Stage 1 & 5a
 Lithuanian Road Race Championship
 Lithuanian Time Trial Championship
 Kirghizistan Road Race Championship
 Kirghizistan Time Trial Championship
 Ukrainian Road Race Championship
Karp Milicki
Wyścig Kolarski
Stage 4 Tour de Pologne
Stage 2a Course 4 Asy Fiata Autopoland
2003
Stage 1 & 3 Szlakiem Grodów Piastowskich
Stage 7 Course de la Paix
Overall Bałtyk–Karkonosze Tour
Stage 6a
Overall Bohemia Tour
Stage 3
Overall Tour of Małopolska
Stage 1 & 2
Memoriał Henryka Łasaka
Puchar Ministra Obrony Narodowej
Stage 2 Tour de Slovaquie
Wyścig Kolarski o Puchar Trzech Miast
Overall Tour de Pologne
Stage 6
2004
Stage 1 Bałtyk–Karkonosze Tour
Overall GP de Beauce
Stage 2
 Kirghizistan Road Race Championship
 Kirghizistan Time Trial Championship
Overall Course de la Solidarité Olympique
Stage 3
Overall Dookoła Mazowsza
Stage 3
Puchar Ministra Obrony Narodowej
Szlakiem Walk Majora Hubala
Overall Tour de Slovaquie
Stage 3a
Stage 6 Tour de Pologne
2005
Stage 1 Niedersachsen-Rundfahrt
Overall Szlakiem Grodów Piastowskich
Stage 2 & 4
Międzynarodowy 3-Majow Wyścig
Stage 5 Four Days of Dunkirk
Stage 3 & 6 Bałtyk–Karkonosze Tour
 Polish Road Race Championship
Overall Course de la Solidarité Olympique
Stage 1, 2, 3 & 4
Pomorski Klasyk
Overall Tour of Małopolska
Overall Hessen-Rundfahrt
Stage 2
2006
Stage 5 Bałtyk–Karkonosze Tour
 Polish Road Race Championship
Stage 3, 6 & 9 Tour of Qinghai Lake
2nd Overall Tour de Luxembourg
2007
Stage 3 & 4 Szlakiem Grodów Piastowskich
 Polish Time Trial Championship
Overall Course de la Solidarité Olympique
Stage 4
Overall Tour of Hainan
Stage 5 & 7
2008
Stage 7 Tour of Japan
Overall Szlakiem Grodów Piastowskich
Stage 5 Tour of Qinghai Lake
Stage 6 Bałtyk–Karkonosze Tour
2009
Memoriał Andrzeja Trochanowskiego
Overall Szlakiem Grodów Piastowskich
Stage 2
Stage 1 & 7 Bałtyk–Karkonosze Tour
2010
Overall Szlakiem Grodów Piastowskich
Stage 1
Overall Tour of Małopolska
 Poland, Road Race Championship
Overall Course de la Solidarité Olympique
Stage 4 & 5
Memoriał Henryka Łasaka
Puchar Uzdrowisk Karpackich

2012 squad

External links

UCI Continental Teams (Europe)
Cycling teams based in Poland
Cycling teams established in 1996